The Bishop's Gambit is a variation of the King's Gambit, a chess opening that begins with the moves:
1. e4 e5
2. f4 exf4 (The King's Gambit Accepted)
3. Bc4
Compared to the main line, the king's knight gambit (3. Nf3), there is very little theory on the Bishop's gambit and most lines are nameless. The bishop's gambit is the most important alternative to 3. Nf3.

White allows 3...Qh4+ 4. Kf1. White lost the possibility to castle, but the king is safe on f1 and white can gain several tempi on the black queen, for example with Nf3. The famous Immortal Game started with this line.

White's plan is usually to develop quickly and start an attack on the kingside using the half-open f-file and the bishop on c4.

Many of black's defenses include the move ...d5 attacking the bishop on c4.

Plans, ideas and Transpositions 
In some lines, White can transpose to the king's knight gambit by an early Nf3.

The general plans are mostly the same as in the king's knight gambit, especially attacking along the half-open f-file, but there are some minor differences.

As there is no Knight on f3, white's queen is free to move along the diagonal d1-h5. Against weak black defenses Qh5 is often a good move, threatening scholar's mate. Also, the most frequent idea in the knight gambit, ...g7-g5-g4, doesn't attack a knight on f3. That's why pushing the g-pawn in the knight gambit is considered one of the best defenses, whereas in the bishop's gambit it is considered one of the weakest. White often delays developing the knight g1 or develops it to e2. From e2 the knight also supports a knight on c3 which is especially useful when the knight on c3 is pinned by a bishop on b4.

In some lines white's queen moves to f3 building a battery with a rook on f1 (after 0-0) piling up on black's f4-pawn.

Black can try to give the pawn back via ...f4-f3. This is especially strong after white castled kingside and has to take back with gxf3 shattering the kingside pawns. If white hasn't castled, white should try castling queenside and use the half-open g-file for an attack on black's king.

Modern defense 3...d5 

3...d5 is one of the best defenses against both the king's knight and king's bishop gambit. Black gives back the extra pawn for a rapid development. A transposition via 3...Qh4+ 4. Kf1 d5 is also possible.
4. exd5 is considered good for black. This position can also occur by transposition via the Falkbeer Countergambit. 1. e4 e5 2. f4 d5 3. exd5 exf4. The main line is 4...Qh4+ 5. Kf1 Bd6!
4. Bxd5 avoids the bishop being blocked by its own pawn on d5. Now a transposition in the knight gambit is possible with lines that are considered good for white.
4...Qh4+ 5. Kf1. Now black has a choice between 5...Nf6, 5...c6 and 5...g5
4...Nf6 is the most common move:
5. Nc3 is best according to theory but Johansson thinks it leads to a very technical games which doesn't suit most white players.
5. Bc4!?
5. Nf3, first played by Paul Morphy and Greenway together with white in 1858.

3...Qh4+ 

3...Qh4+ 4. Kf1 was the main line in the 19th century. Black can also delay the check for one move. White lost the possibility to castle, but the king is safe on f1 and can not be further attacked by the queen. White can start attacking black's queen with moves like Nf3 and win several tempi. Emanuel Lasker considered 3...d5 4. Bxd5 Qh4+ to be the refutation of the bishop gambit, but according to modern theory it is playable for both sides.

In general, white shouldn't attack black's queen without reason. When the diagonal back to d8 is blocked by ...g5 or ...Nf6, then attacking the queen is stronger as the queen can't go back to d8. Then the knight manoeuver Nb1-c3-d5/b4-c7 is strong, which would fork black's king and a8-rook.

Another idea for white is to play Qf3 and attack black's queen with g3. White's queen defends the rook on h8 which is necessary for the g3-attack. Another idea after g3 is to play Kg2 and Rh1-f1.

4...Nf6. An idea is to play Nf6-g4 and ...Qf2#. White should now immediately attack the queen with 5. Nf3! Black would get a nice position after 5. Nc3? Ng4 6. Nh3 (covers f2) 6...c6.
4...d6 and white has a choice between 5. Nc3 and 5. d4. They transpose very often after some moves.
4...g5 was in the 19th century a popular move, but is hardly ever played since the 20th century. White can just play 5. Nc3 and develop. The black queen can't go back do d8 to defend c7.

Modern main line 3...Nf6 4. Nc3 c6 

This is the modern main line. Johansson calls it Jaenisch-Bogoljubov-Defense but without telling why. Famous Grandmasters with that names are Carl Jaenisch and Efim Bogoljubov. It is the most common defense in the 21st century and the best according to theory. Black's plan is to play ...d5 and get some active pieces. In many lines Bb4 is a good move, pining a knight on c3. In some lines, white has to sacrifice the pawn e4 but gets a strong attack.

There are two popular continuations, which lead to the same position after a few moves:
5. Bb3 d5 6. exd5 cxd5 7. d4
5. d4 d5 6. exd5 cxd5 7. Bb3

Black now can develop pieces on active squares but has weak pawns on d5 and f4. White's main choice is the development of the knight g1 to either f3 or e2. Johansson and Simon Williams recommend Ne2: This attacks f4, defends the knight on c3 especially after being attacked by ...Bb4 and blocks possible checks along the e-file.

Sidelines 
There are many sidelines:
3...Be7. Now 4. Nf3 leads to the Cunningham Gambit. White can also play 4. Qh5!? or 4. d4 which is considered better than transposing to the cunningham.
3....f5 the Lopez-Gianutio-Countergambit or Nordic countergambit first played in Adolf Anderssen - Louis Eichborn 1854. It was analyzed in depth by Sörensen in 1873 in the journal Nordische Schachzeitung
3...h6 tries to establish a fortress with ...g5 and ...d6. White should delay developing the knight and play h4 after ...g5.
3...d6. Now 4. Nf3 leads to the Fischer Defense, but good alternatives are 4. d4 and 4. Nc3
3...Ne7 was often played by Ivan Sokolov  and Wilhelm Steinitz and analyzed by Sokolov. The idea is to play ...Ne7-g6 to defend the pawn f4.
3...b5, sometimes called Bryan-Gambit after Thomas Jefferson Bryan, tries to get the bishop c4 off the diagonal to f7. The idea is similar to b2-b4 in the Evans Gambit. The first game is from 1841 and was played by Lionel Kieseritzky against Desloges. The Immortal Game started with this line.
3...g5 is a bad defense. White's best plan is to play h4 opening the h-file for the rook and attack with the queen. The move h4 can be prepared with 4. Nc3.

References

Further reading 
 Alexei Suetin: Russisch bis Königsgambit. Sportverlag, Berlin 1989, 2. Aufl., S. 226–228, .
 Thomas Johansson: The Fascinating King's Gambit. Trafford 2004, .
 Paul Keres, Iwo Nei: Dreispringerspiel bis Königsgambit. Sportverlag, Berlin 1977 (4. Aufl.). S. 298–306.
 Simon Williams: King's Gambit Bd. 1. , Chess Base DVD.
 John K. Shaw: The King's Gambit. S. 435–468, Quality Chess, Glasgow 2013, .

External links 
 Annotated games

Chess openings